"I Can't Reach Her Anymore" is a song written by Mark Petersen and Bruce Theien, and recorded by American country music artist Sammy Kershaw.  It was released in January 1994 as the fourth single from the album Haunted Heart.  The song reached number 3 on the Billboard Hot Country Singles & Tracks chart.

Content
The narrator expresses the desire to rekindle a relationship with his ex-lover, whom he walked away from.  After having a couple of awkward conversations the narrator states his desire to talk about the past. She begins to avoid his phone calls, either hanging up or further distancing herself from him when he attempts to contact her.

Chart performance
"I Can't Reach Her Anymore" debuted at number 69 on the U.S. Billboard Hot Country Singles & Tracks for the week of January 15, 1994.

Year-end charts

References

1994 singles
1993 songs
Sammy Kershaw songs
Song recordings produced by Buddy Cannon
Song recordings produced by Norro Wilson
Mercury Records singles